DB Insurance Co, Ltd., formerly Hankook Automobile Insurance, is a South Korean insurance company. It is headquartered in Seoul and was established in 1963. The fire insurance group division of the company controls a large portion of the South Korean calling card market under the insurance brand name Promy.

History 
Founded on January 24, 1969, by Junki Kim, the founding chairman. DB Insurance, which was launched as Korea's first public auto insurance company in 1962, became a member of DB Group in 1983 and changed its name to Dongbu Insurance in October 1995. On November 1, 2017, the company changed its name to DB Insurance in order to become a global insurance finance company.

See also
Wonju DB Promy

References

External links
 

Insurance companies of South Korea
Companies based in Seoul
Financial services companies established in 1963
South Korean brands
DB Group